Rezvanshahr County (or Hashtpar: هشتپر) is in Gilan province, Iran. The capital of the county is the city of Rezvanshahr. At the 2006 census, the county's population was 64,193 in 16,518 households.The following census in 2011 counted 66,909 people in 19,398 households. At the 2016 census, the county's population was 69,865 in 22,246 households.

Administrative divisions

The population history of Rezvanshahr County's administrative divisions over three consecutive censuses is shown in the following table. The latest census shows two districts, four rural districts, and two cities.

Gallery

References

 

Counties of Gilan Province